A big cat is a cheetah, cougar, jaguar, leopard, lion, snow leopard or tiger.

Big Cat or Big Cats may also refer to:

Music 
 The Big Cats, an American rock band
 Big Cats (producer), American hip hop producer
 Big Cat Records, a UK record label
 Big Cat Records (U.S. record label)
 "Big Cat", a song from Boy King by Wild Beasts
 "Big Cat", a track from Volume 2: Release by Afro Celt Sound System

People 
 Big Cats (producer), American hip hop producer 
Andrei Vasilevskiy ("the Big Cat"), Russian ice hockey goaltender

Vehicles 
 ORA Big Cat, a prototype electric car model
 Big Cat HPV, maker of Catrike tricycles
 Collective nickname for "Panther" or "Tiger" models of German tanks in World War II

See also
 Big the Cat, a character in the Sonic the Hedgehog video games
 The Big Cat (disambiguation)